Vasilios Konstantinos Lampropoulos (born 31 March 1990), simply known as Vasilios Lampropoulos, is a Greek professional footballer who plays as a centre-back for Bundesliga club VfL Bochum and the Greece national team.

Club career
Lampropoulos was born in Pyrgos on 31 March 1990, and he has played for Apollon Kalamarias, Asteras Tripolis, Ilioupoli, Ethnikos Asteras, and Panionios.

On 24 January 2014, Lampropoulos decided to continue his career to AEK Athens in the Football League, starting the 2013–14 season.

On 8 April 2017, Lampropoulos ruptured his anterior cruciate ligament in a Super League game against Platanias and underwent a successful surgery, while his comeback was estimated in around six months. In his day of surgery, Lampropoulos extended his contract with the Greek Cup winners by two years, despite being ruled out for six months with a knee injury. The 27-year-old's contract had been due to expire in the summer of 2017, but that has been stretched to 2019 by his club. Lampropoulos always had the desire to remain at AEK Athens and he was more than happy to commit his future to the club for the next two years.

On 12 April 2017, Lampropoulos agreed to a contract extension with AEK, until the summer of 2019.

On 26 November 2018, despite the fact that he was a key figure for the club, following the Super League defeat from Panetolikos, AEK owner Dimitris Melissanidis engaged in a heated conversation with three players, ostracizing Lampropoulos, André Simões and Anastasios Bakasetas from the team. "For Simoes, Lampropoulos and Bakasetas, who have not agreed to sign a new contract, we will search for options to allow them to leave in January". said the owner of the club. In his press conference ahead of the upcoming Champions League game against Ajax, head coach Marinos Ouzounidis practically confirmed that the trio would not be a part of his team anymore: "These guys have helped the team a lot, but since we talked and couldn’t reach an agreement, it’s probably best for the club to make a decision". Unless Lampropoulos, Simoes and Bakasetas all suddenly decided to pen a new deal with AEK, they would not play for the club again. Last season, a similar situation developed with goalkeeper Giannis Anestis, who was subsequently ostracized from the team after refusing to extend his contract.

On 27 June 2019, Deportivo La Coruña confirmed the signing of Lampropoulos on a free transfer for the next two seasons. Deportivo missed out on promotion to La Liga, this year after losing to Mallorca in the playoffs.

On 31 January 2020, Lampropoulos joined VfL Bochum on loan until the end of the 2019–20 season.
On 14 August 2020, he has signed a two-year contract with VfL Bochum of the 2. Bundesliga. The 30-year-old centre-back had been on loan at Bochum from Deportivo during the second half of the previous campaign. On 15 December 2020, he faced a muscle injury in a game against Hannover 96 and he estimated to be in the injury list for at least four months. At the end of the season VfL Bochum were crowned champions of 2. Bundesliga and promoted to Bundesliga.

International career
On 9 November 2018, Greece new coach Angelos Anastasiadis called up Lampropoulos for the match against Finland and Estonia for UEFA Nations League. On 15 November 2018, he made his debut in a 1–0 home win game against Finland.

Career statistics

Club

Honours
AEK Athens
Superleague: 2017–18
Football League: 2014–15 (South Group)
Greek Cup: 2015–16

VfL Bochum
2. Bundesliga: 2020–21

References

External links

1990 births
Living people
Footballers from Pyrgos, Elis
Greek footballers
Association football defenders
Greece international footballers
Greece under-21 international footballers
Greece youth international footballers
Super League Greece players
Segunda División players
Bundesliga players
2. Bundesliga players
Olympiacos F.C. players
Apollon Pontou FC players
Asteras Tripolis F.C. players
Ilioupoli F.C. players
Ethnikos Asteras F.C. players
Panionios F.C. players
AEK Athens F.C. players
Deportivo de La Coruña players
VfL Bochum players
Greek expatriate footballers
Greek expatriate sportspeople in Spain
Expatriate footballers in Spain
Greek expatriate sportspeople in Germany
Expatriate footballers in Germany